Acanthopagrus schlegelii, commonly known as the blackhead seabream, Japanese black porgy or sea bream, is a fish often farmed for food in Japan. It is one of the most popular fishes for game fishing in Japan.

The body is ovoid and compressed, and its streamlined body makes it a fast swimmer. The mouth is small, terminal and with many incisor-like canines. It is an aggressive predator. The dorsal fin has 10 to 12 spines and 10 to 15 soft rays, which are used for offence and defence.

References

blackhead seabream
Fish of Japan
Fish of East Asia
blackhead seabream